Dzhalgan (Tat: Жалгъан) is a rural locality (a selo) in Derbentsky District, Republic of Dagestan, Russia. The population was 725 as of 2010. There are 25 streets.

Geography 
Dzhalgan is located 19 km southwest of Derbent (the district's administrative centre) by road. Derbent and Sabnova are the nearest rural localities.

Nationalities 
Azerbaijanis live there.

References 

Rural localities in Derbentsky District